"You Made Me Love You (I Didn't Want to Do It)" is a popular song from 1913 composed by James V. Monaco with lyrics by Joseph McCarthy. It was introduced by Al Jolson in the Broadway revue The Honeymoon Express (1913), and used in the 1973 revival of the musical Irene.

One of the earliest singers to record the song was Al Jolson. His rendition was recorded on June 4, 1913. It was released as Columbia A-1374 and was an international hit. In Britain, Columbia had to order 25,000 copies from the U.S. to satisfy unprecedented demand for a gramophone record. Another successful recording in 1913 was by William J. Halley. Al Jolson recorded the song again on March 20, 1946, released as Decca 23613. Jolson also performed the song for the soundtrack of the 1946 film The Jolson Story.

In 1937, Roger Edens wrote additional lyrics to the song for Judy Garland. The new lyrics cast Garland in the role of a teenage fan of Clark Gable. Garland sang the song to Gable at a birthday party thrown for him by Metro-Goldwyn-Mayer (MGM). MGM executives were so charmed by her rendition that she and the song were added to the film Broadway Melody of 1938. Garland recorded the "Gable" version on September 24, 1937.  It was released as Decca 1463. MGM released the song as a b-side in 1939, opposite Garland's recording of "Over the Rainbow" from The Wizard of Oz.

Recordings and other renditions
 Grace La Rue recorded the song with an unnamed orchestra conducted by Kennedy Russell for His Master's Voice on August 22, 1913 and issued on record number 03343.
 Bing Crosby recorded the song with The Merry Macs on July 23, 1940 for Decca Records and it charted briefly, reaching the No. 25 spot in the charts.
 Harry James and His Orchestra hit big in late 1941 and early 1942 with a million-selling instrumental version of the song as a trumpet solo featuring James. It was released as the B-side of "A Sinner Kissed an Angel" but proved the much bigger hit, peaking at no. 5 on Billboard's National and Regional Best Selling Retail Records chart in late November 1941 during an 18-week run (including ten non-consecutive weeks in the Top Ten). In 2010 the recording was inducted into the Grammy Hall of Fame. "You Made Me Love You" remains one of Harry James's signature recordings.
 The Four Freshmen included it on their 1955 4 Freshmen and 5 Trombones album.
 Screamin' Jay Hawkins recorded the song for a single in 1957 "You Made Me Love You" / "Darling, Please Forgive Me" [OKeh 7084]. It later appeared on his 1957 debut album At Home with Screamin' Jay Hawkins.
 Nat "King" Cole (1959) Capitol Records F4184 US
 Country Music singer Patsy Cline recorded the song for her 1962 album Sentimentally Yours.
 Aretha Franklin recorded the song for her album "The Electrifying Aretha Franklin" (1962).
 Ronnie Dove recorded the song in 1967 for his album The Best of Ronnie Dove Volume 2 for Diamond Records.
 Harry Nilsson sings the song on his 1973 covers album A Little Touch of Schmilsson in the Night.
  British comedian Bernard Manning performed the song on side one of his 1975 album 'My Kind of Music'.
 Canadian Brass recorded an instrumental version of the song for their CD High Society (2004).
 Rufus Wainwright sings the song on his 2007 album, Rufus Does Judy at Carnegie Hall.
 Barry Manilow covered the song on his 2010 collection, The Greatest Love Songs of All Time.
 Gloria Estefan covered the song on her 2013 album, The Standards.
 Taylor Walling of the band The Wallings Jr. covered the song on the soundtrack for the 2014 romantic drama The Song.
 Louis Davids translated the song into Dutch; this version was recorded by Dutch band The Animal Crackers on their album Tante To heeft Radio .

In film and television
 The melody was featured prominently in the score for the 1943 Edward Dmytryk movie Tender Comrade starring Ginger Rogers and Robert Ryan.
 Jeanette MacDonald sings one stanza of this song in the 1948 musical Three Daring Daughters.
 Doris Day performed the song in the 1955 Ruth Etting biographical film Love Me or Leave Me.
 An outtake of The Beatles Anthology showed that it was originally to be included in their movie Magical Mystery Tour
 George Burns and some of the Muppets performed a humorous version of this song, where Gonzo especially gets a kick out of the line "didn't want to do it".
 On The Carol Burnett Show (Season 10, Episode 15, aired January 15, 1977), audience member Terry McCann sang the song with Carol Burnett during her show's question and answers segment,
 Olivia Newton-John sings the song in the 1980 film Xanadu, as a vocal on a record presented as a Glenn Miller band performance. The song is largely background to Danny and Sonny talking, and does not appear on the film's soundtrack album, but it does appear as the B-side of her single "Suddenly".
 In the 1980 film Somewhere in Time, when Christopher Reeve's character time travels back to the year 1912, he arrives in a hotel room where a woman occupant is (anachronistically) humming the song.
 The 1941 recording by Harry James and His Orchestra features prominently in Woody Allen's 1986 film Hannah and Her Sisters.
 The song is sung in the 1990 Robin Williams / Robert De Niro film Awakenings
 Bette Midler, Marc Shaiman, and Bruce Vilanch wrote new lyrics to Judy Garland's version of the song for Midler's appearance on the penultimate episode of The Tonight Show Starring Johnny Carson on May 21, 1992.  Midler performed the song as "You Made Me Watch You," a tribute to Carson's 30 years as host.
 Mayim Bialik performed the song on Blossom in the episode "Ruby" (Season 3, Episode 14, aired December 21, 1992).
 Billy Crystal sang an altered version of this song on the first episode of The Tonight Show with Jay Leno.
 Cookie Monster (Voiced by Frank Oz) performed a slightly re-written version of the song in a Sesame Street insert, writing a love letter to his favorite cookie.
 This song is being played by a band during a dance scene in Disney's 2005 film The Greatest Game Ever Played.
 Kim Poirier sings the song in the 2010 movie Foodland as her character Lucy Eklund.
 An instrumental version of the song plays as source music from a radio in the first scene of the 2009 movie Coco Chanel and Igor Stravinsky
 This song is sung by Jack Halford and Gerry Standing in the TV series New Tricks.
 This song is sung by Matt Doyle at the conclusion of the film Private Romeo (2011).
 This song is sung by senior citizens in a commercial for Hoveround in 2011.
 In an episode of the Nickelodeon animated series Rugrats ("Pedal Pusher/Music"; Season 6, Episode 13, aired March 6, 1999), Tommy Pickles (voiced by E.G. Daily) sang a slightly altered version of the song to his brother, Dil.
In the season 1 Family Guy episode "Mind Over Murder", Lois Griffin sings this song in Peter's basement bar.
 This song is sung by a street busker played by Taylor Walling in the 2014 romantic drama The Song.
 This song is sung by Abigail Spencer in the 3rd episode of the 2nd season of Timeless.
 This song is featured in the 5th episode of the 4th season of The Mary Tyler Moore Show (episode "Lou and That Woman").
 In the season 1 Boy Meets World episode "The Fugitive", Amy Matthews (Betsy Randle) briefly sings this song while vacuuming her sons' room.

In theatre
 Sherie Rene Scott sings the song in her one-woman show Everyday Rapture.

References 

1913 songs
Songs with music by James V. Monaco
Songs with lyrics by Joseph McCarthy (lyricist)
Al Jolson songs
Judy Garland songs
Patsy Cline songs
Aretha Franklin songs
Shirley Bassey songs
Nat King Cole songs
Grammy Hall of Fame Award recipients
Cultural depictions of Clark Gable
Songs about actors